The Irrepressibles is the creative guise of British musician Jamie Irrepressible.

History
Formed in 2002, the Irrepressibles have released three full studio albums and six EPs. All songs are written by Jamie Irrepressible. According to the musician, the project's name is "about breaking boundaries in music and being honest about being gay in music". Based in London, England, for many years, Irrepressible currently works from Berlin, Germany. The artist changed his name from "Jamie McDermott" to "Jamie Irrepressible" in 2013, on his collaboration with Norwegian electronic duo Röyksopp.

2009: From the Circus to the Sea
The project's first release was the soundtrack to Shelly Love's The Forgotten Circus, issued in January 2009. The Independent described the group as one of Britain's best-kept secrets.

2010: Mirror Mirror
On 11 January 2010, the Irrepressibles released their debut studio album, Mirror Mirror, a collection of twelve baroque pop songs produced by Dimitri Tikovoi and William Turner Duffin and written by Jamie McDermott. The album features the single "In This Shirt".

Mirror Mirror received critical acclaim. The Guardian called it "theatrical and very different, a ripe, colourful riposte to all that is Cowell", and The Independent described it as "a dramatic soundscape dripping with echoes of the Weimar Republic and Belle Époque."

"In This Shirt"
The track "In This Shirt" garnered critical and public acclaim after it was used as the soundtrack for the short film The Lady Is Dead, by Israeli production company PAG Films, which Sundance Channel described as "fantastic". It was remixed by various artists, including Röyksopp, Hercules & Love Affair, and Zero 7.

The song received renewed attention in 2018, when it was used by French figure skater Kévin Aymoz as his free-skating program. It again gained prominence in 2020, through its widespread use in videos on TikTok during the COVID-19 pandemic.

2012: Nude
In November 2012, the Irrepressibles released their second album, Nude. Self-produced by McDermott, the record received critical acclaim. The Quietus described it as a "remarkably varied and unpredictable album", stating that "the results border on the spectacular". The Independent gave it 4 out of 5 stars, calling it "an act of bravery in a cowardly world", where McDermott "heralds homosexual love as a heroic, romantic and redemptive force".

Nude EPs
2013 saw the release of Nude: Landscapes, the first of three EPs inspired by—and expanding on—the band's second album. This first EP saw the band take a "minimal symphonic" and "acoustic" direction, as described by McDermott in an interview with QX magazine. The second EP, Nude: Viscera, released on 14 February 2014, "brings together influences from new wave, grunge, and exotica". The third EP, Nude: Forbidden, was released on 6 April 2014.

2018: Third album: Superheroes
On 31 May 2018, the Irrepressibles released a new single, "Submission", from their forthcoming third album. The video, directed by Cypriot filmmaker Savvas Stavrou, was featured on Nowness. A second single, "Dominance", was released on 22 November 2018. The visuals, a collaboration between Italian photographer Paride Mirabilio and Turkish director Mertcan Mertbilek, were featured on the website Pornceptual. A third single, "Anxiety", was released on 29 November 2018 and a fourth, "International", on 22 March 2019. The video for the latest track was directed by Jamie Irrepressible, in collaboration with Ukrainian director Alexey Romanowski, and was featured by New Noise Magazine. A fifth single, "Let Go (Everybody Move Your Body Listen to Your Heart)", was released on 27 March 2020 and described by Clash as "an absolute bulldozer - a stunning pop missile that explodes staid sexual norms." A video for it was directed by Savvas Stavrou and featured in Kaltblut magazine. A sixth single, "The Most Beautiful Boy (Strong Outside a Man but Inside a Boy)", was published on 23 July 2020, alongside the album. The record was acclaimed by the media, with Loud and Quiet describing it as "cleverly inflecting the central romance with incisive commentary on masculinity and mental health." The Quietus stated it was "hard not to fall in love with this album" and a "beautiful open book of his journey uniting with his mental health, masculinity and homosexuality".

Collaborations
In 2012, McDermott collaborated with Hotel Pro Forma and the Latvian Radio Choir on WAR SUM UP. The project toured extensively worldwide, receiving acclaim from Danish outlet Gaffa as well as The New York Times.
In 2013, McDermott provided guest vocals on Rex the Dog's single "Do You Feel What I Feel" as well as Röyksopp's singles "Something in My Heart" and "Twenty Thirteen".
In 2014, he also featured on Röyksopp's album The Inevitable End, on the tracks "You Know I Have to Go", "I Had This Thing", "Here She Comes Again", and "Compulsion", in addition to the previously released "Something in My Heart", on which he was credited for the first time as Jamie Irrepressible. In 2015, having relocated to Berlin, McDermott began working with American alternative country artist Jon Campbell and produced his debut EP, released in 2016.

Studio band/musicians

2009: From the Circus to the Sea
 Charlie Stock – viola, backing vocals
 Jordan Hunt – violin, backing vocals
 Sophie Li – double bass, backing vocals
 Nicole Robson – cello, backing vocals
 Sarah Tobias – clarinet, saxophone, backing vocals
 Sarah Kershaw – piano, church organ, backing vocals
 Gary Hughes – flute, backing vocals
 Olivia Duque – oboe, backing vocals
 Jamil Reyes – orchestral percussion, vibraphone, glockenspiel, backing vocals

2010: Mirror Mirror
 Jamil Reyes – orchestral percussion, vibraphone, glockenspiel, backing vocals
 Charlie Stock – viola, backing vocals
 Jordan Hunt – violin, backing vocals
 Sophie Li – double bass, backing vocals
 Nicole Robson – cello, backing vocals
 Sarah Tobias – clarinet, saxophone, backing vocals
 Sarah Kershaw – piano, church organ, backing vocals
 Gary Hughes – flute, backing vocals
 Olivia Duque – oboe, backing vocals

2012: Nude
 Jamie McDermott – lead vocals, electric and acoustic guitars, piano, synthesizers, drum programming
 Jordan Hunt – violin, backing vocals
 Charlie Stock – viola, backing vocals
 Sophie Li – double bass, backing vocals
 Nicole Robson – cello, backing vocals
 Sarah Kershaw – piano, backing vocals
 Ian Tripp – drums, backing vocals
 James Field – drums, backing vocals
 Robbie Wilson – programming, audio manipulation

Live musicians
2010: Mirror Mirror
 Craig White – oboe, backing vocals
 Rosie Reed – flute, backing vocals
 Anna Westlake – clarinet, saxophone, backing vocals
 Amy Kelly – orchestral percussion, vibraphone, glockenspiel, backing vocals
 Charlie Stock – viola, backing vocals
 Jordan Hunt – violin, backing vocals
 Sophie Li – double bass, backing vocals
 Nicole Robson – cello, backing vocals
 James Field – drums, backing vocals

2012: Nude
 Ian Tripp – drums, backing vocals
 Charlie Stock – viola, backing vocals
 Jordan Hunt – violin, backing vocals
 Sophie Li – double Bass, backing vocals
 Nicole Robson – cello, backing vocals
 James Field – drums, backing vocals
 Chloe Treacher – cello, backing vocals

2014: Nude EPs
 Sarah Kershaw – piano, backing vocals
 Chloe Treacher – cello, bass, backing vocals
 Ollie Hipkin – drums, backing vocals
 Apollo – violin, backing vocals

Discography

Studio albums
 Mirror Mirror (2010)
 Nude (2012)
 Superheroes (2020)

EPs
 My Witness (2005)
 Knife Song (2005)
 From the Circus to the Sea EP & DVD (2009)
 Nude: Landscapes (2013)
 Nude: Viscera (2014)
 Nude: Forbidden (2014)

Singles
 "In This Shirt" (2011)
 "Two Men in Love" (2012)
 "New World" (2012)
 "Arrow" (2012)
 "Submission" (2018)
 "Anxiety" (2018)
 "Dominance" (2018)
 "International" (2019)

Music videos
 "I'll Maybe Let You" (directed by J. J. Stevens)
 "Arrow" (directed by Jamie McDermott)
 "New World" (directed by Jamie McDermott)
 "Two Men in Love" (directed Jamie McDermott)
 "Forbidden" (directed by Jamie McDermott)
 "Edge of Now" (directed by Jamie McDermott)
 "Submission" (directed by Savvas Stavrou)
 "International" (directed by Jamie McDermott and Alexey Romanowski)
 "Calling for Change" (directed by Joel Ryan McDermott)
 "Let Go (Everybody Move Your Body Listen to Your Heart)" (directed by Savvas Stavrou)
 "The Most Beautiful Boy (Strong Outside a Man but Inside a Boy)" (directed by Savvas Stavrou)

References

External links
 

English pop music groups
LGBT-themed musical groups